Riccardo Barbuti (born 12 March 1992) is an Italian footballer who plays for  club Pistoiese.

Biography

Sassuolo
Born in Sassuolo, Emilia region, Barbuti started his career at U.S. Sassuolo Calcio. Barbuti was a player of the under-17 team in 2008–09 season.

In 2012–13 season he was signed by Barletta in a co-ownership deal, for a peppercorn of €500. In June 2013 Sassuolo bought Barbuti, also for a peppercorn of €500. In summer 2013 Barbuti was a player of Aprilia, which his future club Pescara also loaned Riccardo Ragni and Marco Iannascoli to the team. Barbuti scored 9 goals, 1 goal behind Antonio Montella.

Pescara
On 1 July 2014 Barbuti became a free agent. He was immediately signed by Pescara on a free transfer. On 3 August Barbuti was signed by Pordenone in a temporary deal. On 16 January 2015 Barbuti was signed by Torres.

Lumezzane
Barbuti was included in the first team of Pescara at the start of 2015–16 Serie B. He wore no.23 shirt. On 31 August he was signed by Lumezzane in a temporary deal. On 29 July 2016 Barbuti was signed by Lumezzane in a 2-year deal.

Fano
On 21 August 2019, he signed a 2-year contract with Fano.

Trento
On 12 July 2021, he signed with newly promoted Serie C club Trento.

Pistoiese
On 1 September 2022, Barbuti joined Serie D club Pistoiese.

References

External links
 AIC profile (data by football.it) 
 

1992 births
People from Sassuolo
Footballers from Emilia-Romagna
Sportspeople from the Province of Modena
Living people
Italian footballers
Association football forwards
U.S. Sassuolo Calcio players
A.S.D. Barletta 1922 players
Delfino Pescara 1936 players
Pordenone Calcio players
F.C. Lumezzane V.G.Z. A.S.D. players
S.S. Teramo Calcio players
U.S. Gavorrano players
Alma Juventus Fano 1906 players
A.C. Trento 1921 players
U.S. Pistoiese 1921 players
Serie B players
Serie C players
Serie D players